is the thirteenth solo album by Susumu Hirasawa.

Background
In April 2015, the alternate reality game  was started on Hirasawa's website. It segued into the story of the album's Interactive Live Show concerts held a week after the album's release.

Track listing

Personnel
Susumu Hirasawa - Vocals, Guitars, Keyboards, Personal computer, Digital audio workstation, Synthesizers, Sampler, Sequencer, Programming, Production
Kenji "sato-ken" Sato - Backing Vocals on "The Iron Cutting Song (The Man Climbing an Iron Mountain)"
Masanori Chinzei - Recording, Mixing, Mastering
Toshifumi Nakai - Design
Syotaro Takami, Grae - Translation
Presented by Chaos Union/TESLAKITE: Mika Hirano, Rihito Yumoto, Kinuko Mochizuki and Hyūga Yukino

Chart performance

References

External links
The Man Climbing the Hologram special page
Samurai Facing the Past: The machinations in the Psi'gahara Field

Susumu Hirasawa albums
2015 albums